C. Kevin Gillespie S.J. was the 27th president of Saint Joseph's University, from July 1, 2012 to 2015. He replaced former president Timothy R. Lannon. Gillespie graduated from St. Joe's in 1972 and is native to the Philadelphia area.

Early life and education
Gillespie received a bachelor's degree in psychology from St. Joseph's University as well as a master's degree in psychology from Duquesne University. He also received a master's degree in divinity from the Jesuit School of Theology Berkeley along with a Ph.D. in pastoral psychology from Boston University.

Career
Gillespie worked at Loyola University Chicago as the associate provost in the University Centers of Excellence. Gillespie is the first alum to serve as university president in over a century.

Gillespie has been an active member of the Saint Joseph's University Board of Trustees since 2006.

References 

Living people
Year of birth missing (living people)
Presidents of Saint Joseph's University
Saint Joseph's University alumni
Duquesne University alumni
Jesuit School of Theology at Berkeley alumni
Boston University School of Theology alumni
Educators from Philadelphia
20th-century American Jesuits
21st-century American Jesuits
Pastors of Holy Trinity Catholic Church (Washington, D.C.)